Kanzlersgrund ski jump hills or Schanzenanlage im Kanzlersgrund (also Hans-Renner-Schanze, Rennsteigschanze or Schanze am Rennsteig) are ski jumping hills in Oberhof, Germany.

History
Large hill was opened in 1959 and normal in 1987 and are owned by WSW Oberhof 05. It hosted four FIS Ski jumping World Cup events in 1989, 1991 and 2005 and more world cup events in Nordic combined. Anssi Koivuranta holds the hill record which is also the world record set on plastic mate.

Ski jumping venues in Germany
Sports venues in Thuringia
Sports venues completed in 1959
1959 establishments in East Germany
1987 establishments in East Germany
Sport in Oberhof, Germany
Buildings and structures in Schmalkalden-Meiningen